The Manitoba Junior Hockey League goal-scoring leader during the regular season.

MJHL Top Goal Scorers

CJHL Leaders highlined

See also
List of top goal scorers in the Manitoba Junior Hockey League

External links
Manitoba Junior Hockey League
Manitoba Hockey Hall of Fame
Hockey Hall of Fame
Winnipeg Free Press Archives
Brandon Sun Archives

Goal